"World of Our Own" is a song by Irish boy band Westlife. It was released on 18 February 2002 as the second single from their third studio album of the same name (2001). The song peaked at number one on the UK Singles Chart, becoming their 10th number-one single. "World of Our Own" was the 40th-best-selling single of 2002 in the UK and received a platinum sales certification from the British Phonographic Industry (BPI) for over 600,000 sales and streams. It is the band's fourth-most-streamed song and 12th-best-selling single in both paid-for and combined sales in the United Kingdom as of January 2019.

Critical reception
Chuck Taylor from Billboard called it "a definitive pop song", praising its "joyfully catchy chorus, itchy train-track-clacking beat, velvet harmonies" and Shane Filan's "glossy, emotive vocals", concluding that "Westlife deserves its shot in America, and this is the perfect song with which to take aim."

Music video
The video of this song was directed by Cameron Casey and it was Rat Pack styled. The band members are dressed up as gangsters and they enter in an American Hummer. Until the first chorus, the band members sing beneath a bridge. Then, they go to the balcony of a futuristic building then on a deserted bridge. As they sing, the darkness lifts and the sun shines making everybody (the people) happy. The song ends with the scene shifting from the top of the roof of yet another futuristic building to back under the bridge from where the song initiated.
 
There is a video for the US version as well, which is more mature than the band's earlier videos. This video, directed by Antti Jokinen, features the band singing in an abandoned building with broken walls and surrounded by shrubbery. The video occasionally cuts to various couples kissing and necking each other while the band continue to sing in the building equipped with mics and seating on sofas. The video also shows the boys having fun at a party lit by candles, drinking beer and flirting with girls. The video ends in the same fashion it begins: by zooming out of the building.

Another video features the group members recording the song in a studio.

Track listings

UK and Irish CD single
 "World of Our Own" (single remix) – 3:28
 "Crying Girl" – 3:39
 "Angel" (remix) – 4:22
 "World of Our Own" (CD ROM video)

European CD single
 "World of Our Own" (single remix) – 3:29
 "Crying Girl" – 3:39

European limited-edition CD single
 "World of Our Own" (single remix) – 3:28
 "I Promise You That" – 3:35
 "Angel" (CD ROM video)

European DVD single
 "World of Our Own" (the video)
 "World of Our Own" (making of the video)
 "World of Our Own" (studio recording)
 "Angel" (video)

Australian CD single
 "World of Our Own" (single remix)
 "Crying Girl"
 "Angel" (remix)

Australian limited-edition CD single
 "World of Our Own" (single remix)
 "My Private Movie"
 CD-ROM picture book and platinum club link

Credits and personnel
Recording
 Recorded at Rokstone Studios, London

Personnel
 Steve Mac – songwriter, producer, arranger, mixing, piano, keyboards
 Wayne Hector – songwriter, additional backing vocals
 Chris Laws – engineer, drums
 Matt Howe – engineer
 Daniel Pursey – assistant engineer
 Quentin Guine – assistant engineer
 Philipe Rose – assistant engineer

Charts

Weekly charts

Year-end charts

Certifications and sales

Release history

References

2001 songs
2002 singles
Bertelsmann Music Group singles
Irish Singles Chart number-one singles
RCA Records singles
Number-one singles in Scotland
Song recordings produced by Steve Mac
Songs written by Dennis Morgan (songwriter)
Songs written by Simon Climie
Songs written by Steve Mac
Songs written by Wayne Hector
Syco Music singles
UK Singles Chart number-one singles
Westlife songs